The Aluniș is a right tributary of the river Vărbilău in Romania. It flows into the Vărbilău in Ostrovu.

References

Rivers of Romania
Rivers of Prahova County